Driton Selmanaj (born 3 September 1979) is a Kosovo-Albanian politician.

Career
Selamanj was named on 3 June 2020 from the prime minister Avdullah Hoti as the new Deputy Prime Minister of Kosovo, after the fall of the Cabinet of Albin Kurti.

References

Living people
Deputy Prime Ministers of Kosovo
Politicians from Pristina
Kosovo Albanians
Government ministers of Kosovo
1979 births
Democratic League of Kosovo politicians